The Sunshine Coast Cricket Club is a cricket club on the Sunshine Coast, Queensland, Australia. They play in the Queensland Premier Cricket competition. They were founded in 1990.

See also

References

External links
 

1990 establishments in Australia
Cricket clubs established in 1990
Queensland District Cricket clubs
Sport in the Sunshine Coast, Queensland